Bobrovichi is an air base in Belarus located 16 km northeast of Kalinovichi.  It is a large airfield with two large tarmacs on either side, and two alert revetments holding about 10 fighters each.   It was home to 953 BAP (953rd Bomber Aviation Regiment) flying Su-24 aircraft from 1978 subordinated to 1st Guards Bomber Aviation Division (1 GvBAD) in Lida (1960-1980) and then 32nd Bomber Aviation Division (1980-1992). It also hosted 368 OShAP (Independent Shturmovik Aviation Regiment) during the mid-1980s.

References

Soviet Air Force bases
Military installations of Belarus